DPA-714 or N,N-diethyl-2-[4-(2-fluoroethoxy)phenyl]-5,7-dimethylpyrazolo[1,5-a]pyrimidine-3-acetamide is a selective ligand for the translocator protein (TSPO) currently under evaluation for several clinical applications. For this reason, a practical, multigram synthetic route for its preparation has been described.

The binding affinity of DPA-714 for TSPO is reported as Ki = 7.0 ± 0.4 nM.

[18F]DPA-714 is currently under investigation as a potential radiopharmaceutical for imaging TSPO in living systems using positron emission tomography (PET). DPA-714, along with other members of the DPA class of TSPO ligands, has been shown to decrease microglial activation and increase neuronal survival in a quinolinic acid rat model of excitotoxic neurodegeneration, suggesting potential neuroprotective effects.

See also
 DPA-713

References

Pyrazolopyrimidines
TSPO ligands
Fluoroethyl ethers